András Katona (born February 20, 1938) is a Hungarian water polo player who competed in the 1960 Summer Olympics. He was born in Budapest.

In 1960 he was part of the Hungarian water polo team which won the bronze medal in the Olympic tournament. He played one match.

See also
 List of Olympic medalists in water polo (men)

External links
 

1938 births
Living people
Hungarian male water polo players
Olympic water polo players of Hungary
Water polo players at the 1960 Summer Olympics
Olympic bronze medalists for Hungary
Olympic medalists in water polo
Medalists at the 1960 Summer Olympics
Water polo players from Budapest
20th-century Hungarian people
21st-century Hungarian people